Aeolochroma albifusaria is a moth of the family Geometridae first described by Francis Walker in 1866. It is found on New Guinea.

Subspecies
Aeolochroma albifusaria albifusaria (New Guinea)
Aeolochroma albifusaria suffusa Prout, 1927 (Fergusson Island)

References

Moths described in 1866
Pseudoterpnini
Moths of New Guinea